CJVD-FM is a French-language Canadian radio station located in Vaudreuil-Dorion, Quebec.

Owned and operated by Yves Sauvé, it broadcasts on 100.1 MHz using a directional antenna with an average effective radiated power of 1,000 watts (class A). The station has an adult hits format, including music from 1955 to 1995 and identifies itself as CJVD 100,1. CJVD-FM serves Vaudreuil-Soulanges, the West Island communities of Montreal, Valleyfield, Beauharnois and Chateauguay.

The radio station was founded on September 29, 2008, by Sauvé with the collaboration of Richard Noël, two well-known broadcasters in Quebec. These professionals worked during many years for important radio stations before the foundation of CJVD-FM.

The station was given approval by the CRTC on July 6, 2007. However, as Sauvé had requested the 106.3 frequency, which was instead granted to Canadian Hellenic Cable Radio (CHCR) for a multicultural station (which became CKIN-FM), Sauvé's approval was made conditional on submitting a new application to use another frequency. His application for 100.1 MHz was granted on May 2, 2008.

References

External links 
CJVD 100,1
CJVD-FM - Vaudreuil-Dorion

CJVD 100,1 FM  - Live Stream

Jvd
Jvd
Radio stations established in 2008
JVD
Vaudreuil-Dorion
2008 establishments in Quebec